Dominique Delestre (born 18 February 1955) is a French former racing driver. Delestre was born in Nancy, France.

References

1955 births
Living people
French racing drivers
International Formula 3000 drivers
World Sportscar Championship drivers
24 Hours of Le Mans drivers
Place of birth missing (living people)